Nigar Khudadat qizi Rafibeyli (1913–1981, Baku) was an Azerbaijani writer and the Chairman of the Writers' Union of Azerbaijan. She was the mother of Anar Rzayev, novel and short-story writer, and wife of famous writer and poet Rasul Rza.

Early life
Nigar Rafibeyli was born on 23 June 1913 in the town of Ganja. Her parents were medical surgeons. Her father, Khudadat Rafibeyli was the first Azeri surgeon who had studied in Europe. In 1919, he was invited to head the Ganja government by the republican government of Azerbaijan Democratic Republic, but he was soon arrested at instigation by Armenian bolsheviks and sent to Nargin island, where he was executed by bolshevik soldiers.
Nigar Rafibeyli finished her school in Ganja and moved to Baku for her higher education. She studied at Pedagogical Technical School. She taught at school but always wrote novels. Her first poem called "Chadra" (Veil in Azeri) was published in "Dan Ulduzu" magazine in 1928. In years 1930–1932 she worked in the Azerbaijanfilm studio.

Later years
In 1931, she worked in Azerneshr publishing house as the editor and the translator. Rafibeyli then continued her studies in Moscow Pedagogical University. As she studied in Moscow, her first collection of poems was published in Baku. In years 1937–1939, she worked in Ushaqneshr publishing house. Beginning from 1940, she translated into Azeri many works of famous poets and writers of other nations such as Navai, Schiller, Pushkin, Lermontov, Shevchenko and others. For her great contributions to Azerbaijani literature, she received order of Honour. Many of Nigar Rafibeyli's works were dedicated to romanticism, motherhood, nature, motherland.

Nigar Rafibeyli died on 9 July 1981. One of streets in Baku bears her name.

References

External links
Monument to Nigar Rafibeyli in one of Baku parks
One of Nigar Rafibeyli's poems in English

1913 births
1981 deaths
Azerbaijani novelists
Azerbaijani women novelists
Writers from Ganja, Azerbaijan
20th-century Azerbaijani poets
Azerbaijani women poets
20th-century Azerbaijani novelists
20th-century women writers
Soviet novelists
Soviet poets